The Communauté d'agglomération de la région Dieppoise, also known as Dieppe Maritime  is the communauté d'agglomération, an intercommunal structure, centred on the city of Dieppe. It is located in the Seine-Maritime department, in the Normandy region, northern France. It was created on 31 December 2002. Its area is 129.0 km2. Its population was 46,223 in 2018, of which 28,561 in Dieppe proper.

Composition
The communauté d'agglomération consists of the following 16 communes:

Ancourt
Arques-la-Bataille
Aubermesnil-Beaumais
Colmesnil-Manneville
Dieppe
Grèges
Hautot-sur-Mer
Martigny
Martin-Église
Offranville
Rouxmesnil-Bouteilles
Saint-Aubin-sur-Scie
Sainte-Marguerite-sur-Mer
Sauqueville
Tourville-sur-Arques
Varengeville-sur-Mer

See also
Communes of the Seine-Maritime department

References 

Dieppe
Dieppe
Dieppe